Communauté intercommunale du Nord de La Réunion is the communauté d'agglomération, an intercommunal structure, centred on the city of Saint-Denis. It is located in Réunion, an overseas department and region of France. It was created in December 2000. Its area is 287.8 km2. Its population was 207,487 in 2014, of which 150,535 in Saint-Denis proper.

Composition
The communauté d'agglomération consists of the following 3 communes:
Saint-Denis
Sainte-Marie
Sainte-Suzanne

References

Agglomeration communities in France
Intercommunalities of Réunion